"Master of Puppets" is a song by American thrash metal band Metallica, released on July 2, 1986, as the only single from the album of the same name. It was also issued as a promo single in the US by Elektra Records.

The song was recorded during October–December 1985 at Sweet Silence Studios in Copenhagen, Denmark.

The song was bassist Cliff Burton's favorite song on the album, as he said when the album was released. The song is one of the band's most famous and popular songs, frequently played at concerts.

Background and composition
It is the second and title track of the album, preceded by a shorter, high-speed typical thrash metal track, "Battery", a similar sequencing heard on Metallica's second (Ride the Lightning) and fourth (...And Justice for All) albums. "Master of Puppets" is also notable for its extensive use of downpicking and long instrumental section.

According to Dave Mustaine, Lars Ulrich composed the song's opening riff, while Mustaine was still a member of Metallica.

A riff from David Bowie's song "Andy Warhol" (at 0'48") is quoted in "Master of Puppets" (at 6'19"). It is an homage made by Cliff Burton and Kirk Hammett to whom Bowie was a huge influence.

Lyrical meaning 
The song, as lead singer James Hetfield explained, "deals pretty much with drugs. How things get switched around, instead of you controlling what you're taking and doing, it's drugs controlling you."

Live performances
The videos Cliff 'Em All, S&M and S&M2 include live performances of "Master of Puppets" in its entirety. A shortened form appears in Cunning Stunts. Both versions can be seen in the video portions of the Live Shit: Binge & Purge box set.

"Master of Puppets" is the band's most played song, first played on December 31, 1985, at San Francisco's Bill Graham Civic Auditorium for a crowd of 7,000. During the band's World Magnetic Tour, additional live performances were filmed in Mexico City; Nîmes, France and Sofia, Bulgaria. These performances were released on video in November 2009 (Mexico and Nîmes) and October 2010 (Sofia).

The French electronic music duo Justice also played a version of this song on their first live album A Cross the Universe, which was released on November 24, 2008. The last song on the live album named "Final" contains a fairly large sample of "Master of Puppets".

Reception and awards
VH1 ranked the song as the third greatest heavy metal song ever.

In March 2005, Q magazine placed it at number 22 in its 100 Greatest Guitar Tracks list.

Martin Popoff's book The Top 500 Heavy Metal Songs of All Time ranked the song at number 2. Popoff composed the book by requesting that metal fans, musicians, and journalists nominate their favorite heavy metal songs. The author derived the final rankings from a database tallying almost 18,000 votes.

The song also ranked number 1 on a 100 Greatest Riffs poll conducted by Total Guitar magazine.

The readers of Guitar World voted the song as ranking at number 51 among the 100 Greatest Guitar Solos. Lead guitarist Kirk Hammett's solos for "Fade to Black" and "One" ranked significantly higher on the same list.

In 2020, Metal Hammer ranked the song number 1 on its list of the 50 best Metallica songs of all time.

In 2021, it was listed at No. 256 on Rolling Stone's "Top 500 Best Songs of All Time".

Usage in media
"Master of Puppets" is featured in a scene of the 2003 film Old School and is heard as actors Luke Wilson and Will Ferrell play characters who are busy kidnapping people off the street to join their new fraternity. The song was featured in the opening credits for the film Zombieland: Double Tap. The song also appears in a trailer for the upcoming game Marvel's Midnight Suns. The song is also used in a purchasable emote in Fortnite: Battle Royale.

The song is featured in the fourth season finale of the Netflix series Stranger Things, where the character Eddie Munson is seen playing the track in the Upside Down to attract the Demobats. The band said they were "blown away" by the scene. Like with Kate Bush's "Running Up That Hill", which was also featured in the season, the song regained popularity and started charting again following the release of the finale, notably entering the U.S. and UK charts for the first time since the song's original 1986 release. It then peaked at number four in the Netherlands.

Track listing

Personnel
Metallica
 James Hetfield – lead vocals, rhythm guitar, first guitar solo
 Kirk Hammett – lead guitar
 Cliff Burton – bass, backing vocals
 Lars Ulrich – drums

Production
 Flemming Rasmussen
 Metallica

Charts

Weekly charts

Year-end charts

Certifications

See also
Songs about substance abuse

References

1985 songs
1986 singles
Elektra Records singles
Metallica songs
Songs about drugs
Songs written by Cliff Burton
Songs written by James Hetfield
Songs written by Kirk Hammett
Songs written by Lars Ulrich
Stranger Things (TV series)